The Talmadge Memorial Bridge is a bridge in the United States spanning the Savannah River between downtown Savannah, Georgia, and Hutchinson Island. It carries US 17/SR 404 Spur.  The original bridge was built in 1953; a replacement bridge was completed in 1991, also referred to as the Talmadge Memorial Bridge.

History
The original Talmadge bridge was a cantilever truss bridge built in 1953.  It eventually became a danger for large ships entering the Port of Savannah, home to the largest single ocean container terminal on the U.S. eastern seaboard, and the nation's fourth-busiest seaport.  A replacement better able to not impede maritime traffic was completed in March 1991.  The new Talmadge Memorial bridge is a cable-stayed bridge.

Name

The structure is dedicated to Eugene Talmadge, who served as the Democratic Governor of Georgia in 1933-37 and 1941–43.

The replacement bridge was originally suggested to be named for the Native American Creek leader Tomochichi, an important figure in Savannah's founding in 1733. After public forums on the issue, the original name was restored for the new structure.

Proposals for renaming
Talmadge was an old-school conservative Southern Democrat, who pursued then-popular and openly racist objectives such as restoring the white primary and enforcing segregation of the state universities.  He also struck out against opposing centers of power, using martial law to dismiss state boards that opposed his measures as well as arrest both strikers and strikebreakers alike, actions which led to him both being accused of being a dictator as well as being a friend of the "common man."  Talmadge's legacy has caused some in Savannah to oppose letting him have the prominent honor of the bridge named for him, including Savannah's City Council.  However, renaming the bridge is decided at the state level by the legislature, where there is considerably more sympathy for Talmadge.

In September 2017, Savannah City Council passed a resolution to rename the bridge the "Savannah Bridge". A state representative said, "It's time to move forward on a bridge that reminds us of segregation and not solidarity and a name that connects to hate and not hope." It is ultimately up to the Georgia state government to confirm the passed resolution.  Another proposal, pushed by the Girl Scouts, is to rename the bridge after Juliette Gordon Low, a Savannah native who founded the Girl Scouts.  One argument that the pro-renaming faction has raised is that the 1991 bridge may never have actually been formally named at all in the records, meaning it was never the Talmadge Memorial Bridge to begin with.

Dimensions

The new bridge provides  of vertical navigational clearance for oceangoing vessels. The north end of the bridge ends on Hutchinson Island, an island situated between the Savannah River and the Back River. A separate, older, two-lane bridge spans Back River, connecting Hutchinson Island with Jasper County, South Carolina.

Comparison with Arthur Ravenel Jr. Bridge and the Sidney Lanier Bridge

The proximity and rivalry between Charleston, South Carolina and Savannah and Brunswick often lead to comparisons between the Arthur Ravenel Jr. Bridge, the Sidney Lanier Bridge, and the Talmadge Memorial Bridge, all of which carry US 17.  Completed in 2005, the clearance under the Arthur Ravenel Jr. Bridge is actually only  taller than both the Sidney Lanier Bridge and the Talmadge Memorial Bridge. Unlike the Sidney Lanier Bridge and the Talmadge Memorial Bridge, however, the Ravenel Bridge has eight travel lanes; the Talmadge and the Sidney Lanier both have just four lanes. The Ravenel also features a dedicated bike/pedestrian lane. The Talmadge Memorial Bridge also has a similar design as the Alex Fraser Bridge in Vancouver, British Columbia.

Replacement considerations

Savannah is currently undergoing expansion, the Savannah Harbor Expansion Project (SHEP), so the port can accommodate newer, larger vessels.  In September 2018, Savannah Now reported officials thought the Talmadge Bridge may need to be replaced if the port was to service Neo-Panamax vessels.

See also

References

External links
 

Roads in Savannah, Georgia
Buildings and structures in Chatham County, Georgia
Road bridges in Georgia (U.S. state)
Monuments and memorials in Georgia (U.S. state)
Cable-stayed bridges in the United States
Bridges of the United States Numbered Highway System
U.S. Route 17
Crossings of the Savannah River
Bridges completed in 1991